HRS Computing is an opensource scientific software which simulates the hyper Rayleigh scattering (HRS) in nonlinear optics.
The software is designed for researchers, and it is used to verify the agreement between theoretical models and experimental data.

Main features

From the physics point of view the software provides coefficients that are useful for the determination of the microscopic structure of composites, molecules, etc.
 the dipolar and quadripolar coefficients
 the depolarization factor

Using these coefficients, the software also provides:
 the visualization of simulated polar graphics generated by HRS
 molecular position and dipolar momentum in 3D
 easy data and graphics export

External links
 HRS Computing official site

Physics software